The Fengpu Bridge is one of several bridges that crosses the Huangpu River in Shanghai.  Completed in 1995, this bridge links the S4 Shanghai–Jinshan Expressway between Minhang District to the north and Fengxian District to the south.  It currently carries two lanes of the expressway in each direction.  To ease congestion along the bridge, a second bridge is planned to the east of the current bridge.

References 

Bridges in Shanghai
Road bridges in China
Bridges completed in 1995